Stripmall Architecture formed when Ryan and Rebecca Coseboom's previous band, Halou, dissolved. The expanded band includes Tim Hingston (guitar), Patrick Harte (drums), Erica 'Unwoman' Mulkey (cello), and other supporting musicians for their live shows and recording sessions. 

The band used the service Kickstarter to generate funds to produce their new LP, Feathersongs For Factory Girls. Part one was released in April 2010, and part two followed a year later in 2011. Both parts were released together on a limited numbered edition double 10" LP on white vinyl in early 2011.

The band was interviewed on Seattle's KEXP 90.3 radio station on 12/09/09, performing several tracks live in studio. They also covered LCD Soundsystem's song "Drunk Girls". 

Rebecca is also the singer for producer John Fryer's newest project, DarkDriveClinic.

Discography

Albums
We Were Flying Kites (2009)
Feathersongs for Factory Girls (part one) (2010)
Feathersongs for Factory Girls (part two) (2011)
Suburban Reverb (2013)

EPs/compilations
 Object 01 (2008)
 Object 02 (2009)
 Object 03 (2009)
 Pripyat & the Halcyon Versions (2010)
 Albino Peacock (2011)

References

External links
Link to audio files of their visit with Seattle's KEXP radio station
Stripmall Architecture at Facebook
Ourstage.com's review of Stripmall Architecture
Last.fm's listing of Stripmall Architecture

Musical groups established in 2008
Dream pop musical groups
Alternative rock groups from California
Musical groups from San Francisco